Delme may refer to:

Delme, Moselle, a commune in the Moselle department in Grand Est in France
Canton of Delme, a former French administrative division located in the department of the Moselle and the Lorraine region
Delme (river), a river of Lower Saxony, Germany

People with that surname

Peter Delmé (banker) (died 1728), British figure in commerce and banking
Peter Delmé (MP for Ludgershall and Southampton) (1710–1770), wealthy English merchant and landowner, Member of Parliament
Peter Delmé (MP for Morpeth) (1748–1789), English Member of Parliament
Arthur Delmé-Radcliffe (1870–1950), English first-class cricketer